Thierry Lacroix (born 2 March 1967 in Nogaro, France) is a former French rugby union footballer. He won 43 caps playing at fly-half for the French rugby union side. He made his international test debut in Strasbourg at the age of 22 on 4 November 1989, coming on as a replacement for the injured Didier Camberabero against Australia. He was part of the winning side at the 1993 Five Nations Championship. He won his final cap for France on 22 November 1997 against South Africa. Lacroix played in the 1991 Rugby World Cup - a tournament in which the French team was beaten in the quarter final stage by the eventual losing finalist, England - and again in the 1995 Rugby World Cup in which he was the top points scorer with 112 points. France finished the 1995 tournament in 3rd place, defeating a fellow losing semi finalist, England, in the 3rd / 4th place playoff game.

Lacroix started his rugby career at US Dax in the French Ligue Nationale de Rugby. After the 1995 Rugby World Cup in South Africa, he joined  in South Africa where he helped them to two Currie Cups in 1995 and 1996. He then left South Africa for England where he played for Harlequin F.C. and Saracens F.C. In 2000 he left Saracens to join USA Perpignan in France just as Thomas Castaignède signed to take up a position. Lacroix, a qualified physiotherapist, wanted to work in this domain and only played part-time rugby for Perpignan. He finished his rugby playing career at Castres Olympique at the age of 37.

External links 

Thierry Lacroix on Sporting Heroes
The Roar article on Lacroix's predictions for 2007 World Cup

1967 births
Living people
French rugby union players
Rugby union fly-halves
Harlequin F.C. players
Saracens F.C. players
USA Perpignan players
Sharks (Currie Cup) players
France international rugby union players
French expatriate rugby union players
Expatriate rugby union players in South Africa
French expatriate sportspeople in South Africa
French expatriate sportspeople in England
Expatriate rugby union players in England
US Dax players
Castres Olympique players